Mihály Lukács (November 19, 1954 – October 18, 2012) was a Hungarian Romani politician, a founding member of the Lungo Drom party. He was a member of the National Assembly (MP) from Fidesz National List between 2002 and 2006.

He worked in the Committee on Employment and Work (2002–2005) and in the Committee on Youth and Sports (2005–2006). He served as Vice-President of the National Gypsy/Roma Council (OCÖ/ORÖ) since 1999. Lukács died on October 18, 2012, at the age of 57, following a long illness.

References

1954 births
2012 deaths
Hungarian Romani people
Members of the National Assembly of Hungary (2002–2006)
People from Jász-Nagykun-Szolnok County
Romani politicians